The Advanced Ability Center was a breakaway organization from the Church of Scientology established by former Scientologist David Mayo after he left the Church in February 1983 – a time when most of Scientology's upper and middle management was removed following the formation of the Religious Technology Center (RTC) and RTC head David Miscavige's restructuring of the church. David Mayo had been Hubbard's own auditor. The Advanced Ability Center later became the Theta International movement and was also known as the Church of the New Civilization.

Mayo taught material from the upper part of The Bridge of the Scientology organization in the Advanced Ability Center. A division of the Advanced Ability Center was closed down again in 1984 under pressure from the main organization. According to Perspectives on the New Age edited by James R. Lewis and J. Gordon Melton and published in 1992, the Advanced Ability Center formed in Milan was in competition with the Scientology organization in Italy.

See also
 Advanced Ability Centre

References

Free Zone (Scientology)
Scientology